Meeting Joe Strummer is a two-handed play by Paul Hodson

Introduction 
Meeting Joe Strummer is a perceptive, funny, and hard-hitting play about male friendship, integrity, and the struggle to retain youthful idealism in the face of life’s bitter blows, which was an Edinburgh Festival Fringe First winner in 2006. The play originally starred actors Steve North and Nick Miles and was produced by Brighton Theatre Events at The Gilded Balloon. It subsequently toured the UK in Autumn 2007 with Steve North and Huw Higginson taking the role of 'Nick' and in March/April 2010 with Steve North playing 'Steve' and Jason Pitt playing 'Nick', produced by The Future is Unwritten Theatre Company and directed by Paul Hodson.

Story 

Fortysomethings Nick and Steve meet again for the first time in years at a gig by Joe Strummer and the Mescaleros. They have seen a lot since they first met as teenagers watching The Clash play the Rock Against Racism rally at Victoria Park in 1978: divorce, class warfare, acid house, the bleak Thatcher years and even soap stardom, but the flame of punk idealism – what they describe as the “inner Strummer” – has never quite gone out.

Have they done what they wanted in their lives? Can they put their past differences behind them? And - most importantly - will they meet their hero, Joe Strummer?

With a cast of only two, the play is performed with no props on a bare stage in front of a large banner of Joe Strummer. There are rapid jump cuts in time and place between scenes.

External links 
 The Future is Unwritten Theatre Company set up by Paul Hodson and news about future and current tours of the play.
 Review of play from The Guardian
 Strummerville, the charity set up by the friends and family of Joe Strummer in the year after his death. The charity seeks to reflect Joe's unique contribution to the music world by offering support, resources and performance opportunities to artists who would not normally have access to them.
 Obituary in The Independent by Chris Salewicz, later author of the biography Redemption Song

2006 plays
Comedy plays
English plays